Thanaset Sujarit (born 15 November 1994) is a Thai professional footballer who plays as a right back for Thai League 1 club PT Prachuap.

Club career
In 2012, Thanaset made his professional Thai League 1 debut for Chonburi at the age of 17.

References

External links
 

1994 births
Living people
Thanaset Sujarit
Thanaset Sujarit
Association football defenders
Thanaset Sujarit
Thanaset Sujarit
Thanaset Sujarit